Berube Lake is a lake in geographic Lee Township in the Unorganized West Part of Timiskaming District, in northeastern Ontario, Canada. The lake is in the Saint Lawrence River drainage basin and is on Lillord Creek. The nearest community is Sesekinika,  to the east.

The primary inflow is Lillord Creek arriving at the northwest from Lillord Lake. There is a secondary inflow at the southeast. The primary outflow, at the northeast, is Lillord Creek, which flows southeast on the way to its mouth at the Blanche River. The Blanche River flows via Lake Timiskaming and the Ottawa River to the Saint Lawrence River.

References

Other map sources:

Lakes of Timiskaming District